Telangana State Industrial Infrastructure Corporation also known as (TSIIC) is a Government of Telangana initiative for providing infrastructure through the development of industrial areas in the state of Telangana.

TSIIC is established in 2014 for identifying and developing potential growth centres in the state fully equipped with developed plots/sheds, roads, drainage, water, power and other infrastructural facilities;

Objectives
Industrial Promotion
Infrastructure Development
Land Acquisition
Project Construction

See also
Financial District, Hyderabad
Software industry in Telangana

References

State agencies of Telangana
Economy of Telangana
State industrial development corporations of India
2014 establishments in Telangana
Government agencies established in 2014